Robin Windsor (born 15 September 1979) is a British professional Latin and Ballroom dancer, best known for his appearances in the BBC television series Strictly Come Dancing.

Personal life
Windsor was born in Ipswich, Suffolk, and grew up in the Spring Road area.  He attended Clifford Road Primary and Copleston High School. He has been dancing since he was three, when his parents took him to the Ipswich School of Dancing. At age 15, Windsor moved to London to pursue his career as a dancer.

Windsor lived in London with his partner Davide Cini, to whom he had announced his engagement on 21 August 2013. The relationship ended shortly after and in February 2014, it was confirmed that he was in a relationship with X Factor runner-up Marcus Collins. In January 2013 Robin was on the cover of Gay Times and again in 2014 with Marcus Collins. The couple split up in February 2015 but got back together later that year, although the couple have now separated again.

Competitive career
Robin's interest in dance was initiated by his parents when they enrolled him at the age of three in a local dance school in Ipswich. From the beginning, Robin studied both Ballroom and Latin dance, eventually competing in those disciplines at the highest levels. His skills eventually led him to represent England, amassing numerous World Championships, both on the domestic and international level.
Windsor competed successfully in the juvenile and junior ballroom dancer categories. He represented England in the World Championships.

Professional Partnership

In 2010 Robin's first season of Strictly Come Dancing Kristina Rihanoff became his professional partner.  
Robin and Kristina have performed Solo Routines on Strictly Come Dancing and have also taken their partnership off the Strictly Dance Floor, with them both headlining Burn the Floor in Londons West End  in 2013.
The Partnership has taken them all over the World, from Charity events to Strictly Cruise Ship events, they have performed in the South African version of Strictly Come Dancing and teaching large groups at this special event.

Dance Shows
Summer 2015 saw Robin and Kristina in the touring Theatre Production of 'Puttin' On The Ritz' Starring Kristina Rihanoff and Robin Windsor from the hit BBC TV show Strictly Come Dancing Featuring the most famous song and dance moments of the last 50 years of the golden age of Hollywood, recreated live on stage.
Puttin on The Ritz took the audience on a wonderful song and dance journey and featured music from George Gershwin, Irving Berlin, Cole Porter and more with a cast of award-winning singers and dancers.

Robin and Kristina also took part in Dance Weekends around the county  Dancing with The Stars Weekend
Friday 10th – Sunday 12 July 2015 Beaumont Estate Hotel, Old Windsor, Berkshire.

Dance Lessons

Robin has started his own branded Dance Lessons with Beginners Ballroom in March 2015 with a Music Hall feel at Cecil Sharp House in London   
and Same Sex Ballroom Lessons in a Music Hall Setting starting at The Wilton Music Hall, London in April 2015

Theatre
From 2003 to summer 2010, Windsor was part of the cast of Burn the Floor, one of the leading ballroom-based shows in the world. Two tours with Burn the Floor (2003, 2004) and three with FloorPlay (2006 to 2008) took him several times around the world, leading up to the highlights being a stint on Broadway (2009) and in the London West End (2010). In Windsor's last season with Burn the Floor in London, he was engaged in the role of Swing having to learn all male dancers' parts, to step in for any one who was unable to perform. From Broadway Robin's abilities took him to Dancing with the Stars Australia and So You Think You Can Dance in Holland. He was also asked to assist in the choreography for the Australian version of So You Think You Can Dance.

In 2012 Robin starred in Dance To The Music Tour along with his professional partner Kristina Rihanoff, fellow Pro Dancer from Strictly Come Dancing Artem Chigvintsev and Kara Tointon who won the Strictly Glitter Ball in 2010. With music from the Strictly Come Dancing Band the show toured the UK in a successful run.

In 2013 from 6 March to 30 June 2013 Robin returned to headline Burn the Floor along with his professional partner Kristina Rihanoff, a hugely successful run in the heart of London's West End at the Shaftesbury Theatre.

Charity
Together with fellow SCD dancer Artem Chigvintsev, Windsor posed for the Cosmopolitan December 2010 Centerfold Raising Awareness for Male Cancer. In January 2011 he took part in the Greater Manchester Police's campaign against Domestic Violence, together with the cast of the SCD Tour 2011.
Robin supports The Stonewall Charity campaigning for Gay, Lesbian and Bisexual Equality 
Robin supports The Mad Trust with its West End Bares charity event seeing the Theatre Community coming together to raise money for HIV Charity, Robin hosted the auction in 2013 ending up completely naked on stage.
Robin and Kristina took part in Eva Longorias Global Gift Foundation in London in 2013

Strictly Come Dancing

Highest and lowest scoring performances per dance

Series 8
In September 2010, Windsor joined the BBC's Strictly Come Dancing as one of the three new male professional dancers.  For his first year Robin was partnered with actress Patsy Kensit. Robin's professional partner is Kristina Rihanoff. Both have performed for many celebrities including Neil Diamond, Alice Cooper, Rod Stewart and Katherine Jenkins.
His first series (Series 8), with his Celebrity partner Patsy Kensit, he reached the seven place.

On 17 December 2010, Windsor won the Grand Piano Pro Challenge on Strictly Come Dancing's sister programme It Takes Two with 3548 points in front of Brendan Cole (1907) and Natalie Lowe (1091).

Windsor and Kensit also took part in the Strictly Come Dancing pro/celeb tour in January and February 2011 dancing the Salsa and the Viennese Waltz reaching respectable scores of between 60 and 53 out of 60 (including a few 10s for their Viennese Waltz towards the end of the tour).

After the end of the tour, Windsor started a series of performances with his new professional partner Kristina Rihanoff.

Series 9
On 15 June 2011 the BBC announced that Windsor would again be competing in the 2011 series of Strictly Come Dancing. In the launch show for Strictly Come Dancing Series 9 on 10 September 2011, Windsor was paired with actress Anita Dobson, with the couple being named "Team Dobbin" by Robin Windsor on Twitter. They were eliminated on 27 November 2011 after Windsor had been unable to dance for a week due to an injury.  Dobson therefore rehearsed and danced the Cha Cha Cha and the Swingathon with Brendan Cole Windsor also won this year's Children in need special and was partnered with BBC Breakfast's Susanna Reid.

In Week 6 Jennifer Grey guest judged for Goodman.
In Week 9, Windsor didn't dance with Dobson due to an injury, and was replaced by Brendan Cole.

Series 10
In June 2012, it was announced that Windsor would return to be a professional dancer for the third time. This time, he was paired with actress and presenter Lisa Riley. Robin enjoyed his most successful series of Strictly to date in 2012 when he reached the semi-final dancing with actress Lisa Riley. The pair were the people's favourite and wowed audiences in the UK as part of the Strictly Come Dancing live tour in 2013.

Series 11
In June 2013, Windsor confirmed his return as one of the male professional dancers for the eleventh series of the show. His celebrity partner was Dragon's Den panellist, businesswoman and entrepreneur Deborah Meaden. The couple were eliminated in week 5. The pair went on to compete in the Strictly Come Dancing live tour.

Series 12
Windsor could not participate as a partner in Series 12 because of a back injury and had surgery on his back and was replaced by Trent Whiddon. But he did appear in week nine, on 23 November 2014, in the opening professional sequence, as a policeman, dancing to "Rock This Town" by the Stray Cats.

Christmas Specials
(Scores in brackets are judges individual scores in this order: Revel Horwood, Bussell, Goodman, Tonioli)

Windsor has been in three Strictly Christmas Specials:
 2013: Windsor partnered TV and radio presenter Sara Cox they won 33 points for their waltz to Silent Night (7, 8, 9, 9)
 2014: he partnered one of his most popular partners Lisa Riley and danced a jive to Step into Christmas, earning 32 points (8, 8, 8, 8)
 2015: he partnered Series 12 contestant Alison Hammond. They danced a cha cha cha to Celebration and scored 31 (7, 8, 8, 8)

References

1979 births
Living people
British ballroom dancers
English male dancers
LGBT dancers
LGBT choreographers
English LGBT people
Entertainers from Ipswich